Herbert Hill (born October 1, 1984) is an American professional basketball player for Nishinomiya Storks of the B.League.

Hill attended Providence College. He stands . In 2007, Hill became the third Friar to lead the Big East Conference in scoring, following Eric Murdock and Ryan Gomes. Hill was drafted in the second round, 55th overall, by the Utah Jazz in the 2007 NBA draft, and subsequently traded to the Philadelphia 76ers. However, he has never played in the NBA, instead embarking on a long career overseas.

On December 17, 2014, Hill signed with Al Muharraq of Bahrain. On March 3, 2015, he signed with Champville SC of the Lebanese Basketball League. In April 2015, he signed with Gigantes de Guayana of Venezuela.

In January 2017, Hill was signed by the Saigon Heat of the ASEAN Basketball League to replace the injured Christien Charles.

References

External links

1984 births
Living people
American expatriate basketball people in Japan
American expatriate basketball people in Lebanon
American expatriate basketball people in the Philippines
American expatriate basketball people in South Korea
American expatriate basketball people in Venezuela
American expatriate sportspeople in Bahrain
American men's basketball players
Bakersfield Jam players
Barangay Ginebra San Miguel players
Caciques de Humacao players
Centers (basketball)
Goyang Carrot Jumpers players
Daegu KOGAS Pegasus players
Korean Basketball League players
Nishinomiya Storks players
Philippine Basketball Association imports
Power forwards (basketball)
Providence Friars men's basketball players
Saigon Heat players
Seoul Samsung Thunders players
Toyotsu Fighting Eagles Nagoya players
Tulsa 66ers players
Utah Jazz draft picks
Wonju DB Promy players